Death of a Nation is a live DVD by Anti-Flag. It was filmed throughout
The Terror State tour at a variety of North American shows. Death of a Nation features a variety of performances in different types of venues.

Track listing 
"Death of a Nation" – 1:58
"Turncoat" – 2:22
"Got The Numbers" – 2:52
"You Can Kill The Protester, But You Can't Kill The Protest" – 2:21
"This Machine Kills Fascists" – 2:10
"Underground Network" – 3:27
"Rank-N-File" – 3:42
"Bring Out Your Dead" – 2:09
"Captain Anarchy" – 2:42
"Sold As Freedom" – 2:13
"No Borders, No Nations" – 3:00
"Tearing Everyone Down" – 2:53
"911 For Peace" – 3:20
"Mind The G.A.T.T." – 3:01
"Power To The Peaceful" – 2:53
"Angry, Young And Poor" – 2:41
"Watch The Right" – 2:44
"A New Kind of Army" – 3:36
"Post-War Breakout" – 2:42
"Spaz's House Destruction Party" – 3:21
"That's Youth" – 3:03
"Die For The Government" – 3:23
"Fuck The Flag" – 2:14

Bonus Material
Death of a Nation Video (Previously Unreleased)
Post-War Breakout Video (Previously Unreleased)
Turncoat Video
Behind the scenes content from the "Turncoat" video
Band Interview
Live Radio Show
Behind the scenes tour footage

References

Anti-Flag albums
2004 video albums
2004 live albums
Live video albums
A-F Records albums